The 1956 McNeese State Cowboys football team was an American football team that represented McNeese State College (now known as McNeese State University) as a member of the Gulf States Conference (GSC) during the 1956 NCAA College Division football season. In their second year under head coach John Gregory, the team compiled an overall record of 3–7 with a mark of 0–5 in conference play, and finished sixth in the GSC. In October, McNeese announced it would forfeit all Gulf States games after an ineligible player competed to start the season.

Schedule

References

McNeese State
McNeese Cowboys football seasons
McNeese State Cowboys football